The Bolles School is an American private college preparatory day and boarding school in Jacksonville, Florida. It has a lower school (including pre-kindergarten), a middle school, and a high school, spread across four campuses around the Jacksonville area, and enrolls about 1,800 students a year. The school was founded in 1933 as an all-boys military academy. It dropped its military focus in 1962 and became coeducational in 1971. Its athletics programs have been recognized as some of the best in the Florida High School Athletic Association by Sports Illustrated magazine.

History
The school was founded as an all-boys' military academy in 1933 by Agnes Cain Painter, a friend of philanthropist Richard J. Bolles. The original campus, now known as the San Jose Campus, was formed from San Jose Hotel, a former hotel on San Jose Boulevard near the east bank of the St. Johns River. Bolles announced that it would drop its military status in 1961 and the graduating class of 1962 ended the military era. It began admitting girls in 1971. Today, male and female students are enrolled in relatively equal numbers.

International students have enrolled at Bolles since the late 1930s, and the school maintains separate boys and girls boarding facilities for 90 students from other states and 22 foreign countries. The school also has an active Student exchange program with schools in China, Japan, France and Spain. Participants live with the host family while attending school.

John E. Trainer, Jr. served as the sixth Bolles President / Headmaster from 2002 until 2012 and oversaw the growth of the Bartram campus, creation of an elementary school in Ponte Vedra Beach, and boosting the school's endowment. He was succeeded by Brian E. M. Johnson for the 2012–2013 school year, who was succeeded by Bradley R. Johnson '79, who was succeeded by David J. Farace who was then succeeded by the previous Assistant Head of School Tyler Hodges the ninth head of school since its founding.

The school's campuses include:
Upper School (grades 9–12) - San Jose Campus (Jacksonville)
Middle School (6-8) - Bartram Campus (Jacksonville)
Lower School (pre-kindergarten-5) - Ponte Vedra (Ponte Vedra Beach) & Whitehurst (Jacksonville) Campuses

Academics
Bolles has been a fully accredited Florida high school since 1934. Bolles operates on a two-semester academic year, with each semester split into two quarters. Bolles offers Advanced Placement courses.

Athletics
In 2005, Sports Illustrated named Bolles's athletic program the ninth best in the country, and second best in Florida. Of the top twenty-five schools, Bolles was the only one with an Upper School enrollment of under 1,000 students. Bolles has received the Florida High School Athletic Association's Dodge Sunshine Cup/Floyd E. Lay All-Sports Award (given to the best overall athletic program in each school type/size classification in  Florida) for 21 of the past 22 years, including the past eleven consecutive years. During the 2015–2016 school year, Bolles won 7 different Florida state championships, including boys swimming, girls swimming, girls cross country, boys basketball, girls soccer, girls track and field, and baseball, bringing the school's all-time state championship total to 123.

The outdoor field where its seven outdoor sports teams practice is called "George H. Hodges Field" and in 2016 it was converted to an artificial turf.

The swim team has been coached by Gregg Troy, current head coach at the University of Florida, and 2012 US Olympic men's team head coach. Troy was followed as head coach by Olympic medalist Sergio Lopez until 2014 when Lopez left to become the Singapore national swimming team's head coach. The current Bolles coach is former Olympic swimmer Jon Sakovich. The school's swimming facility has its own offices, weight room (separate from the weight room that the rest of the school uses), and two swimming pools (one Olympic-sized). , the boys swim team has won 29 consecutive Florida state championships and 8 national championships, while the girls team has won 26 consecutive state championships and 9 different national titles. Bolles has had at least one alumnus or student competing in every Summer Olympics since 1972, including 2016 Summer Olympics gold medal winners Ryan Murphy and Joseph Schooling. The Bolles Sharks, Bolles's club swim team, compete and practice year-round.

Since 1989, the school's football team has been coached by Charles "Corky" Rogers, the all-time winningest Florida high school football coach with 465 wins, and has won eleven state championships, ten under Rogers. , Rogers has compiled a record of 324-45 during his tenure at the school, and has led Bolles to the state championship game in 6 of the last 8 years, resulting in 3 championships and 3 runner-up finishes. For the 2009 season, the Bulldogs went 12–1, losing only to Cocoa High School, 44–37 in overtime. They defeated Tampa Catholic in the state championship game on December 12, 21–7.

Activities

The school's drama program performs a musical every second year and a Shakespeare play every third year.  Performing groups include Jazz Ensemble, Stage Band, Choir, Choral Music and Dance.

Notable alumni

 Linden Ashby actor
 Alex Aster author   
Ron Clark Ball author   
 George Bovell Olympic bronze medal swimmer
 Dee Brown former National Basketball Association player
 Greg Burgess Olympic silver medal swimmer
 Travis Carroll former NFL player
 Shaun Chapas NFL fullback for the Detroit Lions
 Santo Condorelli 2016 Olympian for Canada
 Bruce Crump southern rock musician
 Char-ron Dorsey former NFL offensive lineman 
 Javontee Herndon former NFL player
 Charles Hicks two-time European U23 Cross Country champion
 Hayden Hurst NFL tight end for the Cincinnati Bengals
 Trina Jackson Olympic gold medal swimmer
 Jawan Jamison former NFL running back. 
 Chipper Jones former Major League Baseball player and member of the National Baseball Hall of Fame
 Mac Jones New England Patriots quarterback 
 Joseph Kittinger United States Air Force pilot, performed the record highest and fastest skydive at over 100,000 feet as a key member of  Project Excelsior
 David Larson Olympic gold medal swimmer
Amelia Lewis LPGA professional golfer. Attended UF in 2009 on a golf scholarship before turning pro. She currently has 57 professional and amateur wins to her name.
 Brian Liesegang Filter, Nine Inch Nails, Billy Corgan, Veruca Salt; songwriter, producer, musician
 David López-Zubero Olympic bronze medal swimmer
 Martin López-Zubero Olympic gold medal swimmer
 Andrew G. McCabe former deputy director of the Federal Bureau of Investigation
 MacKenzie Miller U.S. Racing Hall of Fame Thoroughbred trainer
 Ryan Murphy 2016 Olympic gold medalist and swimmer for the Cal Golden Bears.
 Anthony Nesty Olympic gold medal swimmer for Suriname
 Gram Parsons country rock musician
 Colin Peek All-SEC and Academic All-SEC tight end for the  University of Alabama 2010 BCS National Championship team and a free agent in the National Football League
 Will Ropp – Actor The Way Back (2020 film)
 Joseph Schooling Olympic gold medalist for Singapore.
 George Scribner Disney Director, Imagineer. Directed Oliver & Company. Professional painter.
 Ryan Silverfield Head Football Coach of the Memphis Tigers.
 Riley Skinner All-ACC quarterback for the Wake Forest University Deamon Deacons and NFL New York Giants
 Austin Slater MLB player with the San Francisco Giants
 Jason Spitz NFL player with the Jacksonville Jaguars
 DJ Stewart – MLB player with the Baltimore Orioles
 John Theus former NFL player.
 David Treadwell former NFL player
 Travis Tygart CEO of the U.S. Anti-Doping Agency USADA
 Fred Tyler Olympic gold medal swimmer
 Arianna Vanderpool-Wallace Olympic swimmer
 Dez White former NFL player
 Ashley Whitney Olympic gold medal swimmer
 Mari Wilensky 2006 Miss Florida
 Rick Wilkins former Major League Baseball player
 George B. Stallings Jr. Served in the Florida House of Representatives from 1959 to 1968

See also

 List of high schools in Florida

References

External links 
 bolles.org, the school's official website
 The Association of Boarding Schools profile

1933 establishments in Florida
Boarding schools in Florida
Educational institutions established in 1933
High schools in Jacksonville, Florida
Preparatory schools in Florida
Private elementary schools in Florida
Private middle schools in Florida
Private high schools in Florida
Southside, Jacksonville